Tai shogi (泰将棋 tai shōgi or 無上泰将棋 mujō tai shōgi "grand chess", renamed from 無上大将棋 mujō dai shōgi "supreme chess" to avoid confusion with 大将棋 dai shōgi) is a large-board variant of shogi (Japanese chess).  The game dates to the 15th century and is based on earlier large-board shogi games.  Before the discovery of taikyoku shogi in 1997, tai shogi was believed to be the largest playable chess variant, if not board game, ever.  One game may be played over several long sessions and require each player to make over a thousand moves. It was never a popular game; indeed, a single production of six game sets in the early 17th century was a notable event.

Like other large-board variants, but unlike standard shogi, the game is played without drops, and uses a promotion-by-capture rule.

Because of the terse and often incomplete wording of the historical sources for the large shogi variants, except for chu shogi and to a lesser extent dai shogi (which were at some points of time the most prestigious forms of shogi being played), the historical rules of tai shogi are not clear. Different sources often differ significantly in the moves attributed to the pieces, and the degree of contradiction (summarised below with the listing of most known alternative moves) is such that it is likely impossible to reconstruct the "true historical rules" with any degree of certainty, if there ever was such a thing. It is not clear if the game was ever played much historically, as the few sets that were made seem to have been intended only for display.

Rules of the game
Tai shogi is essentially a merger of two other large-board shogi variants: dai dai shogi and maka dai dai shogi. Almost all the pieces of those two smaller games are included, and where the same pieces are found, they move the same way. Additionally, many of the tai shogi pieces not from those two games already appear in the even more popular chu shogi. Only nine extra pieces are added that do not appear in any smaller games – the peacock, soldier, vermillion sparrow, turtle-snake, side dragon, golden deer, silver hare, fierce eagle, and ram's-head soldier. (Indeed, two of the Edo-era sources generally do not describe a piece for tai shogi if it exists in a smaller variant.)

The promotion rule is contested. Dai dai shogi and maka dai dai shogi have very different promotion rules. The promotion rules given on the Japanese Wikipedia are similar to those of maka dai dai shogi: almost all pieces promote, but most to the lowly gold general, even if they are much more powerful; and many weak pieces turn into "free" versions of themselves (in which stepping moves are replaced by unlimited ranging moves in the same directions). However, the promotion rules given in English-language sources are similar to those of dai dai shogi: most pieces do not promote. Both agree that promotion is compulsory upon capture if the piece can promote.

In maka dai dai shogi with its demotions, The Chess Variant Pages suggest that promotion is only compulsory when capturing a promoted piece, which seems more reasonable because otherwise the most powerful pieces would quickly disappear. However, in tai shogi non-promoting copies of those powerful pieces can be obtained by promoting some weak pieces.

The difference is unusual: in all smaller variants, Japanese Wikipedia agrees with the English-language sources on promotions, even though it does not always agree on the moves. There are additionally some confusions in the Japanese Wikipedia promotions: for example, the fragrant elephant is said to exist in tai shogi, but without a piece promoting into it. Because of this, the promotions from the English-language sources have been followed throughout this article, with alternatives given in the footnotes. That is, most pieces do not promote, and promotion (if possible) is compulsory on capture.

Objective 

The objective of the game is to capture the opponent's emperor and prince (or princes). When the last of these is captured, the game ends. There are no rules for check or checkmate; however, in practice a player resigns when checkmated.

Game equipment 

Two players, Black and White (or 先手 sente and 後手 gote), play on a board ruled into a grid of 25 ranks (rows) and 25 files (columns), for a total of 625 squares.  The squares are undifferentiated by marking or color.

Each player has a set of 177 wedge-shaped pieces of 93 types.  In all, the players must remember 100 moves for these pieces.  The pieces are of slightly different sizes. From largest to smallest (or roughly most to least powerful) they are:

 1 Emperor
 1 Prince
 1 Hook mover
 2 Long-nosed goblins
 1 Capricorn
 2 Peacocks
 2 Soaring eagles
 2 Horned falcons
 2 Queens
 1 Rushing bird
 2 Free demons
 2 Free dream-eaters
 2 Water buffalos
 2 Flying oxen
 2 Soldiers
 2 Dragon kings
 2 Dragon horses
 1 Lion
 2 Racing chariots
 2 Rooks
 2 Bishops
 2 White horses
 2 Whales
 2 Standard bearers
 1 Vermillion sparrow
 1 Turtle-snake
 1 Blue dragon
 1 White tiger
 1 Right chariot
 1 Left chariot
 2 Side dragons
 2 Doves
 1 She-devil
 1 Golden bird
 1 Great dragon
 2 White elephants
 1 Lion dog
 1 Wrestler
 1 Guardian of the Gods
 1 Buddhist devil
 2 Golden deer
 2 Silver hares
 2 Fierce eagles
 1 Old kite
 2 Violent oxen
 2 Flying dragons
 2 Old rats
 2 Enchanted badgers
 2 Flying horses
 2 Prancing stags
 2 Violent bears
 2 Side movers
 2 Vertical movers
 2 Reverse chariots
 1 Phoenix
 1 Kirin
 2 Poison snakes
 1 Northern barbarian
 1 Southern barbarian
 1 Eastern barbarian
 1 Western barbarian
 2 Blind bears
 1 Drunken elephant
 1 Neighbor king
 2 Blind tigers
 2 Blind monkeys
 2 Ferocious leopards
 2 Reclining dragons
 2 Chinese cocks
 2 Old monkeys
 2 Evil Wolves
 2 Angry boars
 2 Cat swords
 2 Coiled serpents
 1 Deva
 1 Dark spirit
 1 Right general
 1 Left general
 2 Gold generals
 2 Silver generals
 2 Copper generals
 2 Tile generals
 2 Iron generals
 2 Wood generals
 2 Stone generals
 2 Earth generals
 2 Go betweens
 2 Knights
 2 Howling dogs
 2 Donkeys
 2 Ram's-head soldiers
 2 Lances
 25 Pawns

Several of the English names were chosen to correspond to rough equivalents in Western chess, rather than as translations of the Japanese names. (Sometimes the queen is called the "free king", a direct translation of its Japanese name. The kirin's name is sometimes anglicised as kylin.)

Each piece has its name in the form of two kanji written on its face. On the reverse side of some pieces are one or two other characters, often in a different color (commonly red instead of black); this reverse side is turned up to indicate that the piece has been promoted during play. The pieces of the two sides do not differ in color, but instead each piece is shaped like a wedge, and faces forward, toward the opposing side. This shows who controls the piece during play.

Table of pieces

Listed here are the pieces of the game and, if they promote, which pieces they promote to.

* The first kanji in 'howling' dog, 𠵇, is not supported by many fonts, and so is created here with the help of an ad hoc superscript 口 . Likewise, the second character in 'Capricorn' should be composed of 魚+曷 (𩹄), and the second character in 'wizard stork' should be 而 atop 鷦.

Setup 

Below is a diagram showing the setup of one player's pieces.  The way one player sees their own pieces is the same way the opposing player will see their pieces.

The queen could also be abbreviated FK (for free king) and the kirin as Ky (for kylin).

Game play 

The players alternate making a move, with Black moving first. (The traditional terms 'black' and 'white' are used to differentiate the sides during discussion of the game, but are no longer literally descriptive.)  A move consists of moving a single piece on the board and potentially promoting that piece or displacing (capturing) an opposing piece. Each of these options is detailed below.

Movement and capture 

An opposing piece is captured by displacement: That is, if a piece moves to a square occupied by an opposing piece, the opposing piece is displaced and removed from the board. A piece cannot move to a square occupied by a friendly piece (meaning another piece controlled by the moving player).

Each piece on the game moves in a characteristic pattern. Pieces move either orthogonally (that is, forward, backward, left, or right, in the direction of one of the arms of a plus sign, +), or diagonally (in the direction of one of the arms of a multiplication sign, ×). The emperor, lion, and knight are exceptions at the beginning of the game, in that they do not move, or are not required to move, in a straight line. (The Buddhist spirit and furious fiend are similar, but they only appear as pieces promote.)

If a piece that cannot retreat or move aside advances across the board until it can no longer move, it must remain there until captured. This applies to the pawn, lance, ram's-head soldier, stone general, wood general, and iron general upon reaching the farthest rank, and to the knight upon reaching either of the two farthest ranks.

Many pieces are capable of several kinds of movement, with the type of movement most often depending on the direction in which they move. The movement categories are:

Step movers
Some pieces move only one square at a time. (If a friendly piece occupies an adjacent square, the moving piece may not move in that direction; if an opposing piece is there, it may be displaced and captured.)

The step movers are the prince, drunk elephant, neighbor king, blind tiger, blind monkey, ferocious leopard, reclining dragon, Chinese cock, old monkey, evil wolf, the generals (except the wood general), angry boar, cat sword, coiled serpent, deva, dark spirit, go between, and the 25 pawns on each side.

Limited ranging pieces
Some pieces can move along a limited number (2, 3, or 5) of free (empty) squares along a straight line in certain directions. Other than the limited distance, they move like ranging pieces (see below).

These pieces are the water buffalo, standard bearer, vermillion sparrow, turtle-snake, blue dragon, white tiger, dove, she-devil, golden bird, great dragon, white elephant, lion dog, wrestler, Guardian of the Gods, Buddhist devil, golden deer, silver hare, fierce eagle, old kite, violent ox, flying dragon, old rat, enchanted badger, flying horse, prancing stag, violent bear, the barbarians, and the wood general.

Jumping pieces

Several pieces can jump, that is, they can pass over any intervening piece, whether friend or foe, with no effect on either. These are the lion, kirin, phoenix, poison snake, donkey, and knight.

Ranging pieces

Many pieces can move any number of empty squares along a straight line, limited only by the edge of the board. If an opposing piece intervenes, it may be captured by moving to that square and removing it from the board. A ranging piece must stop where it captures, and cannot bypass a piece that is in its way. If a friendly piece intervenes, the moving piece is limited to a distance that stops short of the intervening piece; if the friendly piece is adjacent, it cannot move in that direction at all.

The ranging pieces are the soaring eagle, horned falcon, queen, rushing bird, the demons, free dream-eater, water buffalo, flying ox, soldier, dragon king, dragon horse, the chariots, rook, bishop, white horse, whale, standard bearer, vermillion sparrow, turtle-snake, blue dragon, white tiger, side dragon, golden bird, great dragon, white elephant, golden deer, movers, howling dog, ram's-head soldier and lance.

Hook moves (changing tack)

The hook mover, long-nosed goblin, Capricorn, and peacock can move any number of squares along a straight line, as a normal ranging piece, but may also abruptly change tack left or right by 90° at any one place along the route, and then continue as a ranging piece. Turning a corner like this is optional.

The range covered by a hook move is the equivalent of two moves by a rook, or two moves by a bishop, depending on the piece. However, a hook move is functionally a single move: The piece cannot capture twice in one move, nor may it capture and then move on. It must stop before an intervening piece (unless it first changes direction to avoid it), and must stop when it captures, just like any other ranging piece. It can only change direction once per move.

Lion moves (multiple captures)

The lion, lion dog, soaring eagle, and horned falcon have sequential multiple-capture abilities, called "lion moves". Among the pieces that only appear with promotion, so do the teaching king, buddhist spirit, and furious fiend. The details of these powerful moves are described for the lion, below.

Promotion 
The vast majority of pieces cannot promote. Those that can promote, however, must promote at the end of their first capturing move. Promotion is indicated by turning the piece over after it moves, revealing the character for the promoted piece. There are no promotion zones; dots on the board that usually represent promotion zones are present after the sixth rank only as a placement guide for initial setup. All this is as in dai dai shogi.

Promoting a piece has the effect of changing how that piece moves: see the table above for what each piece promotes to.

Pieces which are already promoted cannot promote again, except as follows:

Any piece, promoted or not, that captures a Deva or teaching king (a promoted Deva) promotes to a teaching king. This is effected by replacing it on the board with the captured piece. Similarly, any piece that captures a dark spirit or Buddhist spirit (a promoted dark spirit) promotes to a Buddhist spirit. This is sometimes expressed as the piece being contagious: when something captures a contagious piece type, it becomes that piece type. The only exception is (potentially) royal pieces (emperors, princes, and drunk elephants) which promote to their normal promoted forms, or stay as they are if unpromotable or already promoted.

It is not clear what happens if a multi-capturing piece such as a lion or a lion dog captures two different contagious piece types in one turn, e.g. a lion capturing both a teaching king and a Buddhist spirit on the same turn. Although the situation is very unlikely to arise, an official of the Japanese Chu Shogi Association has suggested in discussion with H. G. Muller (who programmed an engine HaChu for chu shogi and wrote the descriptions for some large shogi variants for The Chess Variant Pages) that the multi-capturing piece would promote to the last piece captured. In the case of a lion dog capturing two pieces on the same orthogonal or diagonal, it would not be permitted to jump over the first piece, capture the second, and then move back to capture the first.

Otherwise, pieces don't promote more than once: they only have two sides.

Individual pieces
In the diagrams below, the different types of moves are coded by symbol and by color: Blue for step moves, yellow for jumps, green for multiple capture, and pink for range moves, as follows: 

Piece names with a grey background are present at the start of the game; those with a blue background only appear with promotion. Betza's funny notation has been included in brackets for easier reference, with the extension that the notation xxxayyyK stands for an xxxK move followed by an yyyK move, not necessarily in the same direction. Larger numbers of 'legs' can be indicated by repeated application of 'a'. Directional modifiers on continuation legs must be interpreted relative to the previous leg, where 'f' means 'continue in the same direction'; default is 'all directions'. The default modality of the final leg is the usual 'mc', but on non-final legs also includes a hop over an obstacle at their end-point, provided the path does not bend back onto itself there. Other (combinations of) modalities must be written explicitly. U denotes the universal leaper, a piece which can jump to any square on the board except the one that it is on.

There are many divergent descriptions in the Edo-era sources. However, almost all the pieces in tai shogi already appear either in dai dai shogi or maka dai dai shogi, and so they are presented here identically to how they are on the Wikipedia articles for those two games. Refer to those pages for footnotes detailing divergent moves. Footnotes are presented as usual for pieces that do not appear in smaller games.

Repetition 
A player may not make a move if the resulting position is one that has previously occurred in the game with the same player to move. This is called repetition (千日手 sennichite). Note that certain pieces have the ability to pass in certain situations (lions, lion dogs, furious fiends, soaring eagles, horned falcons, teaching kings, and Buddhist spirits). Such a pass move leaves the position unchanged, but it does not violate the repetition rule, as it will now be the turn of the other player to move. Of course, two consecutive passes are not possible, as the first player will see the same position as before.

However, evidence from chu shogi problems suggests that this at least does not apply to a player who is in check or whose pieces are attacked, as otherwise one could win via perpetual check or perpetual pursuit. The modern chu shogi rule as applied by the Japanese Chu Shogi Association (JCSA) is as follows, and presumably tai shogi should be similar. If one side is making attacks on other pieces (however futile) with his moves in the repeat cycle, and the other is not, the attacking side must deviate, while in case of checking the checker must deviate regardless of whether the checked side attacks other pieces. In the case of consecutive passes, the side passing first must deviate, making turn passing to avoid zugzwang pointless if the opponent is in a position where he can pass his turn too. Only the fourth repetition is forbidden by these rules. If none of these are applicable, repetition is a draw.

Check and mate 

When a player makes a move such that the opponent's emperor or prince (sole one in play) could be captured on the following move, the move is said to give check to the emperor or prince; the emperor or prince is said to be in check. If a player's emperor or prince is in check and no legal move by that player will get the emperor or prince out of check, the checking move is also a mate, and effectively wins the game.  If a player has both an emperor and one or more princes in play, then the player need not move only one out of check.

Recall that an emperor cannot capture a protected piece, even if that protected piece is the opponent's last royal. (Here "protected" means that the opponent could recapture if we ignore that he has just lost his last royal.) Since an emperor protects all pieces on his side, if both armies have emperors, then the emperors can only capture each other, and even that only if the other emperor is unprotected.

Game end 

A player who captures the opponent's sole remaining emperor or prince wins the game. In practice this rarely happens; a player will resign when loss is inevitable and the emperor or prince will be taken on the opponent's next move (as in International Chess) because of the tradition that it is seen as an embarrassment to lose.

A player who makes an illegal move loses immediately. (This rule may be relaxed in casual games.)

There is a (probably facetious) rule that draws cannot be agreed.

Game notation 

The method used in English-language texts to express shogi moves was established by George Hodges in 1976. It is derived from the algebraic notation used for chess, but differs in several respects.  Modifications have been made for tai shogi.

A typical example is P-8h.
The first letter represents the piece moved (see above).
Promoted pieces have a + added in front of the letter. (e.g., +CC for a wizard stork (promoted Chinese cock).  The designation of the piece is followed by a symbol indicating the type of move: - for an ordinary move or x for a capture.  Next is the designation for the square on which the piece lands.  This consists of a number representing the file and a lowercase letter representing the rank, with 1a being the top right corner (as seen from Black's point of view) and 25y being the bottom left corner.  (This method of designating squares is based on Japanese convention, which, however, uses Japanese numerals instead of letters. For example, the square 2c is denoted by 2三 in Japanese.)

If a soaring eagle, horned falcon, lion or Buddhist spirit captures by 'igui’, the square of the piece being captured is used instead of the destination square, and this is preceded by the symbol '!'.  If a double capture is made, then it is added after the first capture.

If a capture mandates the player to promote the piece, then a + is added to the end to signify that the promotion was taken. For example, ORx7c+ indicates an old rat capturing on 7c and promoting.

In cases where the above notation would be ambiguous, the designation of the start square is added after the designation for the piece in order to make clear which piece is meant.

Moves are commonly numbered as in chess.

Strategy

Piece values
According to the German Chu Shogi Association, the average values of the pieces are as follows. Note that these use the move interpretations of The Shogi Association, e.g. the lion dog as only a three-square limited ranging piece in all directions, with no lion power. They also make the additional change that the prince is allowed to promote to emperor, although TSA rules do not allow this.

These average values do not take into account the special status of the prince as a royal piece, or emperor as disposable if there's a prince and other piece(s). They have also been normalized so that the pawn is worth 1 point to avoid fractions. Additionally, pieces change value if they have a good chance of promotion. This is particularly significant for the hook mover and capricorn, which are two of the most powerful pieces in the game, but "promote" to the weak gold general; and the old kite and poisonous snake, which promote respectively to the hook mover and long-nosed goblin.

See also 
 Shogi variant
 Wa shogi
 Chu shogi
 Heian dai shogi
 Dai shogi
 Tenjiku shogi
 Dai dai shogi
 Maka dai dai shogi
 Taikyoku shogi

Notes on pieces with conflicting descriptions
These descriptions are taken from Japanese Wikipedia, which references the Edo-era publications 象戯図式 Shōgi Zushiki (SZ), 諸象戯図式 Sho Shōgi Zushiki (SSZ), and 象棋六種之図式 Shōgi Rokushu no Zushiki (SRZ). The first two are generally though not always in agreement, but the third differs in the case of most pieces which are not found in smaller shogi variants.

For reasons of space, and to avoid duplication, issues regarding pieces that already appear in dai dai or maka dai dai shogi are discussed in those articles rather than here.

External links 
 Shogi Net. Has links to Evans' free software.
 history.chess/Tai shogi
 Roger Hare's site (2003)

Shogi variants